Gonzaga, officially the Municipality of Gonzaga, is a 1st class municipality in the province of Cagayan, Philippines. According to the 2020 census, it has a population of 41,680 people.

The 2012 film The Mistress, starring John Lloyd Cruz and Bea Alonzo, was partly shot in the town.

History

Pre-Colonial Period and Etymology 
The original inhabitants of Gonzaga were Negritos, especially members of Aeta tribes. The first recorded name of the area was Gampao, an Aeta word meaning 'mountainous,' later changed to Wangag ('river').

Spanish Era 
In the eighteenth century, groups of Ilocano-speaking immigrants arrived in several waves by sea and land, gradually displacing the Aeta in the lowland areas.

Wangag was given ecclesiastical recognition on 23 February 1869, as a barrio of the Municipality of Buguey. In 1917 it was renamed Rumang-ay (Ilocano for 'to be progressive'). The following year, it was renamed after the first Filipino Governor of Cagayan, Gracio P. Gonzaga. The town was officially partitioned from Buguey on 1 January 1918 via Executive Order of Governor-General Francis Burton Harrison.

World War II 
Japanese troops of the Tanaka Detachment from Formosa, as a main invasion force, lands on several locations in Northern Luzon, one of which, is the town of Gonzaga on 10 December 1941.

Geography

Barangays
Gonzaga is politically subdivided into 25 Barangays, including four urban barangays which constitute the Poblacion area. These barangays are headed by elected officials: Barangay Captain, Barangay Council, whose members are called Barangay Councilors. All are elected every three years.

Climate

Demographics

Economy 

Gonzaga is primarily an agricultural municipality, with more than half of the workforce employed primarily as either farmers or fishers. Approximately  of agricultural land are currently under production, the majority of which are dedicated to rice farming.

Government
Gonzaga, belonging to the first legislative district of the province of Cagayan, is governed by a mayor designated as its local chief executive and by a municipal council as its legislative body in accordance with the Local Government Code. The mayor, vice mayor, and the councilors are elected directly by the people through an election which is being held every three years.

The town is located at the north-eastern tip of the province of Cagayan, bordered by the municipality of Santa Ana to the north-east, the municipality of Santa Teresita to the west, and the municipality of Lal-lo to the south.

It has large stretches of virgin forests, especially throughout the mountainous areas of the Sierra Madre mountain range.

The majority of the municipality's  coastline is mostly along the Babuyan Channel to the north, although it is also bounded by the Pacific Ocean to the southeast.

Elected officials

Local chief executives

Education
The Schools Division of Cagayan governs the town's public education system. The division office is a field office of the DepEd in Cagayan Valley region. The office governs the public and private elementary and public and private high schools throughout the municipality.

Notable personalities
Former Senate President and Defense Minister, Juan Ponce Enrile is a native of Gonzaga.
Lilia Cuntapay, a Filipino actress, was dubbed the "Queen of Philippine Horror Movies" was born in the Cabiraoan village of Gonzaga, Cagayan, on September 16, 1935.

References

External links
[ Philippine Standard Geographic Code]
Philippine Census Information
Official Sangunian Bayan ng Gonzaga Website

Municipalities of Cagayan